Gevorg, also spelled Gevork and pronounced and transliterated as Kevork in Western Armenian, is the Armenian version of the name George. Bearers include:

Gevorg
Gevorg Bashinjaghian (1857–1925), painter 
Gevorg Emin (1918–1998), writer
Gevorg Karapetyan (footballer, born 1963), Lebanese-Armenian footballer
Gevorg Karapetyan (born 1990), Armenian footballer
Gevorg Ghazaryan (born 1988), football player 

Gevork
Gevork Kotiantz (1909–1996), painter
Gevork Vartanian (1924–2012), Soviet intelligence agent 

Kevork
Kevork Ajemian (Adjemian) (1932–1998), Armenian writer, journalist, novelist, theorist and public activist, one of the founders of ASALA
Kevork Aslan, Armenian historian
Kevork Chavush (1865–1907), Armenian fedayi in the Ottoman Empire
Kevork Hovnanian (1923–2009), Iraqi-born Armenian-American businessman and home builder, who founder of Hovnanian Enterprises in 1959
Kevork Malikyan (born 1943), English character actor of Armenian descent; played Kazim in Indiana Jones and the Last Crusade

See also
Sourp Kevork Church, Limassol, Cyprus

Armenian masculine given names